The 1990 Eckerd Open was a women's tennis tournament played on outdoor clay courts at the Bardmoor Country Club in Tampa, Florida in the United States that was part of the Tier III category of the 1990 WTA Tour. It was the 18th and last edition of the tournament and was held from April 16 through April 22, 1990. First-seeded Monica Seles won the singles title and earned $45,000 first-prize money.

Finals

Singles
 Monica Seles defeated  Katerina Maleeva 6–1, 6–0
 It was Seles' 3rd title of the year and the 4th of her career.

Doubles
 Mercedes Paz /  Arantxa Sánchez Vicario defeated  Sandra Cecchini /  Laura Gildemeister 6–2, 6–0

References

External links
 ITF tournament edition details
 Tournament draws

Eckerd Open
Eckerd Open
Eckerd Open
20th century in Tampa, Florida
Sports competitions in Tampa, Florida
Eckerd Open
Eckerd Open